Aurora is a feminine given name, originating from the name of the ancient Roman goddess of dawn Aurora. Her tears were said to turn into the morning dew. Each morning she traveled in her chariot across the sky from east to west, proclaiming renewal with the rising of the sun. The Romans also associated the Northern Lights, or the Aurora borealis, with the goddess. Aurora is also traditionally the name of the princess in the fairy tale Sleeping Beauty and the many works of art it has inspired. The tale of a cursed princess who slept for one hundred years and was awakenened by the kiss of a prince might be considered a modern retelling of the ancient story of Aurora the dawn goddess, whose myths also include stories of a long sleep and an awakening at dawn.

It was not in use in the Middle Ages but came into general use in Europe in the 17th century in Sweden, Spain and the Spanish-speaking world and Italy. It was used in the English-speaking world by the 18th century, but was rare until the 20th century. The name has been increasing in popularity in the United Kingdom and across Europe in recent years. The name entered the list of 100 most popular names for newborn girls in the United Kingdom in 2018. The increase in usage was attributed to a trend for “dreamy space names” among British parents who were influenced by social media. Aurora has also grown in popularity for girls in the United States in recent years. Names taken from mythology and those that had positive meanings or associations also increased in use for children born during the Covid-19 pandemic. It has ranked among the 100 most popular names for newborn girls since 2015 and was the 36th most popular name for American girls in 2021.  Rory is a modern English nickname for the name.

Aurore is the French form of the name. Aurore was most popular in France in the 1970s and 1980s, when it was among the 100 most popular names for girls. It is still among the 250 most popular names for French girls in the early 2020s.

The variant used in the Russian language is "" (Avrora). While in use before the 20th century, it became more common after the Russian Revolution of 1917, due to the role cruiser Aurora played in the events. In 1924–1930, the name was included into various Soviet calendars, which included the new and often artificially created names promoting the new Soviet realities and encouraging the break with the tradition of using the names in the Synodal Menologia. Diminutives of this name include "" (Avrorka), "" (Ava), "" (Ara), and "" (Rora).  Avrora is also the Ukrainian form of the name.

People
Aurora Aksnes (born 1996), Norwegian singer-songwriter
Aurora Arias (born 1962), Dominican Republican writer, journalist and astrologer
Aurora Bautista (1925–2012), a Spanish film actress
Aurora Browne, Canadian actress and comedian
Aurora Cáceres (1877–1958), a Peruvian-European writer of the "modernismo" literary movement
Aurora Carlson (born 1987), a television presenter and China scholar
Aurora Castillo (1914–1998), a Mexican-American who co-founded the Mothers of East Los Angeles (MELA) organization
Aurora Chamorro (1954–2020), Catalan swimmer
Aurora Clavel (born 1936), a Mexican film and television actress
Aurora Cornu (1931-2021), a Romanian-born French writer, actress, film director, and translator
Aurora Cunha (born 1959), a Portuguese long-distance runner
Aurora Reyes Flores (1908–1985), a Mexican painter and member of the Mexican muralism movement
Aurora Galli (born 1996), an Italian soccer player
Aurora James (born 1984), Canadian creative director, activist, and fashion designer
Aurora Karamzina née Stjernvall (1808–1902), a Finnish Swede philanthropist and noblewoman
Aurora Königsmarck (1662–1728), mistress of Augustus the Strong, elector of Saxony and king of Poland
Aurora Liljenroth (1772–1836), Swedish scholar 
Aurora Ljungstedt (1821–1908), Swedish horror writer 
Aurora Martinez, director of over 70 Spanish-language action movies
Aurora Mikalsen, Norwegian soccer goalkeeper
Aurora Mira (1863–1939), Chilean painter
Aurora Miranda (1915–2005), a Brazilian entertainer
Aurora Levins Morales (born 1954), a Puerto Rican writer and poet
Aurora Nilsson (1894–1972), Swedish writer
Aurora Estrada Orozco (1918–2011), Mexican American community leader
Aurora Pijuan (born 1949), the 1970 titleholder of the Miss International beauty pageant
Aurora Quezon (1888–1949), first spouse of a Philippine president to be called First Lady
Aurora Robles (born 1980), Mexican supermodel
Aurora Robson (born 1972), Canadian-American artist
Aurora Snow (born 1981), American pornographic actress
Aurore Storckenfeldt (1816–1900), Swedish educator
Aurora Straus, American racecar driver
Aurora Venturini (1922–2015) an Argentine writer and translator
Aurora Wilhelmina Koskull (1778–1852), Swedish lady-in-waiting and salonist
Aurora Ximenes (born 1955), East Timorese politician
Aurora Pavlovna Demidova (1873-1904) Russian noblewoman and the mother of Prince Paul of Yugoslavia

Fictional characters
Aurora, a character in Marvel Comics' Alpha Flight
Aurora, the title character in Anne-Cath. Vestly's Aurora series for children (1966–1972)
Aurora (Disney), a princess from the Disney film Sleeping Beauty
Aurora Espinosa, a character from José Zorrilla's play Traidor, inconfeso y mártir
Aurora Floyd, a character from Mary Elizabeth Braddon's novel of the same name
Aurora Greenway, a character from Terms of Endearment portrayed by Shirley MacLaine
Aurora Hawthorne, the title character of Aurora the Magnificent, a novel by Gertrude Hall (wife of William Crary Brownell)
Aurora Lane (1917), a character in The Broken Gate, a novel by Emerson Hough (adapted into films in 1920 and 1927)
Aurora Lane (2016), a character from the film Passengers
Aurora Leigh, a character in Elizabeth Barrett Browning's poem of the same name
Aurora Sinistra, the astronomy professor in the Harry Potter book series
Aurora Teagarden, a character created by author Charlaine Harris
Aurora Thorpe, the title character of Helen Barnes's novel Killing Aurora
Aurora, the main character of Ubisoft game Child of Light
Aurora 'Rory' Decker-Morningstar: Lucifer's and Chloe's daughter, a character from the show Lucifer (Season 6) (2021)

References

Notes

Sources
Н. А. Петровский (N. A. Petrovsky). "Словарь русских личных имён" (Dictionary of Russian First Names). ООО Издательство "АСТ". Москва, 2005. 
А. В. Суперанская (A. V. Superanskaya). "Словарь русских имён" (Dictionary of Russian Names). Издательство Эксмо. Москва, 2005. 

Danish feminine given names
Finnish feminine given names
Icelandic feminine given names
Italian feminine given names
Norwegian feminine given names
Portuguese feminine given names
Russian feminine given names
Romanian feminine given names
Scandinavian feminine given names
Spanish feminine given names
Swedish feminine given names
English feminine given names
Feminine given names
Given names
Aurora (mythology)